Elanthoor  is a village in Pathanamthitta district of the Southern State of Kerala, India. Situated halfway between Kozhencherry and Pathnamthitta, the area was part of the Kingdom of Travancore presumably since 1820. This peaceful rural belt has a significant place in the history of the freedom movement of the country and has made notable contributions to the film industry. It has been argued that the expression "Ellangalude Oor" shortened by over has become "Elanthoor". "Ellangalude Oor" would mean "aggravation of settlements" or a region of concentration of houses.

Demographics
As of the 2001 India census, Elanthoor had a population of 15,344 with 7135 males and 8209 females.

Location
Elanthoor is located between Pathanamthitta and Kozhencherry. The T. K. Road (Thiruvalla-Pathanamthitta-Kumbazha Road / SH - 07) connects Elanthoor to major towns. The village is easily accessible from the Main Eastern Highway passing through Pathanamthitta.

Nearest Police Stations: Elavumthitta (6 km), Aranmula (8.6 km), Pathanamthitta (8.6 km)

Nearest Railway Station: Chengannur (CNGR) at approximately 18 km

Airports: Trivandrum International Airport (approximately 115 km)

Gandhi's Visit
Gandhi toured Travancore in 1937. This was in connection with the culmination of the Temple Entry Movement. During the tour which Gandhi preferred to call a "pilgrimage", he visited Elanthoor as well at the invitation of K. Kumar (Kumarji). Kumarji or Elanthoor Gandhi, known also as Travancore Kumar, was a famous personality of the bygone era.  He was a veteran freedom fighter and was among the closest of Gandhi's disciples and associates in Kerala. In his speech, Gandhi described Elanthoor as a model village.  He exemplified the historic work done in the region to admit "Dalits" into temples even before the Temple Entry Proclamation. Gandhiji said in his speech, " I tender you my congratulations for having of your own initiative got rid of untouchability even before the issue of the proclamation. The proclamation now sets the steal of approval upon your work and makes your work acceptable to the whole of Travancore". Gandhi inspired everybody to build further upon the great work done. The Mahatma was undoubtedly referring to the brilliant work done by Kumarji for communal harmony, Harijan upliftment, and temple entry. His efforts in Travancore were ably supported by Pandavathu Sankara Pillai and Ennakkadu Valiya Raja, two other important personalities associated with the movement. It seems that at least Bhagavathikunnu Temple and Thevar Nadai in Elanthoor had thrown open their doors to Dalits long before the proclamation. This ignored historical fact should engage the attention of historians and the entire country. Mahadev Deasi too has praised the untiring efforts made in the region to strengthen communal solidarity and to eradicate untouchability.

After the talk, Kumarji introduced Khadar Das TP Gopala Pillai and Pulinthitta PC George to the Mahatma. Mahatmaji scribbled a message on a piece of paper for Gopala Pillai which became an inspiration to him to take to Khadi. Before leaving Elanthoor, Gandhiji named a baby handed to him by Kumarji and had milk and fruits served by Kumarji's mother.

 

 Meera Jasmine, actress
 K. Kumar, Gandhian activist, social reformer and Chief Editor of 'Swadeshabhimani Newspaper previously edited by Swadeshabhimani Ramakrishna Pillai
 Mohanlal, actor, filmmaker 
 Anu Purushoth ,director

References 

Epic of Travancore, Maha Dev Desai, Navjeevan Karyalaya 1937

Gandhi's speech at Elanthoor on 20 January 1937, Complete Works of Mahatma Gandhi

In the Land of K. Kumar, Keraleeya Gramangaliloode (Malayalam), Kattakkada Divakaran, SPCS 1967

9 Freedom Fighters From Kerala, www.pinklungi.com

Freedom Fighters of Kerala- Government of Kerala 1974

Kumar K, Sarva Vijnana Kosam, Government of Kerala

Keralathile Congress Prasthanam, Perunna KN Nair, Prathibha Publications 1967

Thiruvithamkoor Swatantrya Samara Charitram- C Narayana Pillai, Second Edition 2004 Page 401

Wikipedia Article on Pathanamathitta

Villages in Pathanamthitta district